Rhampholeon moyeri, Moyer's pygmy chameleon or Udzungwa pygmy chameleon, is a species of chameleon endemic to Tanzania.

References

Rhampholeon
Reptiles described in 2002
Taxa named by Colin R. Tilbury
Reptiles of Tanzania